Qowsheh-ye Sofla (also Romanized as Qowsheh-ye Soflá and Qūsheh-ye Soflá; also known as Qosheh, Qowsheh-ye Pā'īn, and Qūsheh) is a village in Arshaq-e Shomali Rural District, Arshaq District, Meshgin Shahr County, Ardabil Province, Iran. At the 2006 census, its population was 664, in 154 families.

References 

Tageo

Towns and villages in Meshgin Shahr County